Eleonore Polsleitner was a female guard at the Mauthausen concentration camp in Austria.

Born on 2 October 1920 in Unterach, Austria, Eleonore Polsleitner became a female overseer at the Mauthausen-Gusen concentration camp on 1 November 1944. She trained under Jane Bernigau and has never been prosecuted for war crimes.

References

1920 births
Possibly living people
Mauthausen concentration camp personnel
Female guards in Nazi concentration camps